Stadnicki is a Polish family name. Notable persons with this name include
Fortunat Stadnicki (1818–1872), Polish landowner
Franciszek Stadnicki (1742–1810), Polish noble, deputy to the sejm (Polish parliament)
Stanisław Stadnicki, Polish nobleman

Surnames